Sa'id ibn Yazid ibn Alqama al-Azdi was the governor of Egypt for the Umayyad Caliphate in 682–684.

An Arab from Palestine, Sa'id ibn Yazid was appointed by Caliph Yazid I to succeed Muhammad ibn Maslama in 682. Although he tried to present an image of continuity by keeping Maslama's sahib al-shurta (head of security and de facto deputy), 'Abis ibn Sa'id al-Muradi, the local Arab settler community (wujuh) were opposed to him as an outsider.

In 683, the Second Fitna broke out, and soon after Yazid I's death in November, Ibn al-Zubayr was acknowledged as Caliph at Mecca. Ibn al-Zubayr gained the support of the Kharijites in Egypt and sent  a governor of his own, Abd al-Rahman ibn Utba al-Fihri, to the province. Sa'id ibn Yazid chose not to offer resistance and simply retired. The Kharijite-supported Zubayrid regime was even more unpopular with the wujuh, and lasted for less than a year before the wujuh leaders called upon the Umayyad Caliph Marwan I for aid, who reconquered the province in December 684.

References

Sources 
 

7th-century Arabs
7th-century Umayyad governors of Egypt
Azd